Brigitte Marie-Claude Trogneux Macron (previously Auzière ; born 13 April 1953) is a French former educator. She is the wife of Emmanuel Macron, who is the current President of France and Co-Prince of Andorra.

Early life
Macron was born Brigitte Marie-Claude Trogneux in Amiens, France. She is the youngest of six children of Simone (née Pujol; 1910–1998) and Jean Trogneux (1909–1994), the owners of the five-generation Chocolaterie Trogneux, founded in 1872 in Amiens. The company, now known as Jean Trogneux, is run by her nephew, Jean-Alexandre Trogneux.

Career
Macron, at the time Brigitte Auzière, taught literature at the Collège Lucie-Berger in Strasbourg in the 1980s. By the 1990s, she was teaching French and Latin at Lycée la Providence, a Jesuit high school in Amiens. From 2007 to 2015, she taught at Lycée Saint-Louis de Gonzague, in the 16th arrondissement of Paris, one of the most prestigious French private schools. At that institution, she was the French teacher of Frédéric and Jean Arnault, sons of French luxury business tycoon Bernard Arnault.

It was at Lycée la Providence that she and Emmanuel Macron first met. He attended her literature classes, and she was in charge of the theatre class that he attended. Their relationship has attracted controversy, as she is his senior by close to 25 years, and Macron has described it as "a love often clandestine, often hidden, misunderstood by many before imposing itself".

Politics

In 1989, Brigitte Macron (then Auzière) unsuccessfully ran for a seat in the city council of Truchtersheim. It was the only time she ran for office.

In 2017, Brigitte Macron played an active role in her husband's presidential campaign; a top adviser was quoted as saying that "her presence is essential for him". During his campaign, Emmanuel Macron stated that upon his winning of the French presidency, his wife would "have the role that she always had with [him], she will not be hidden".

He proposed creating an official "first lady" title (as the spouse of the French president currently holds no official title) coming with their own staff, office and a personally allocated budget for their activities. Following Macron's election as president and his previously outspoken stance against nepotism, a petition against his proposal gathered more than 275,000 signatures, and the French government announced that Brigitte Macron would not hold the official title of "first lady" and would not be allocated an official budget. In an interview with French magazine Elle, she stated that a soon-to-be published transparency charter would clarify her "role and accompanying resources", including the composition and size of her staff.

Personal life
On 22 June 1974, Brigitte married banker André-Louis Auzière, with whom she had three children (Sébastien, born 1975; Laurence, born 1977; and Tiphaine, born 1984). They resided in Truchtersheim until 1991, when they moved to Amiens. In 1993, at the age of 40, she met the 15-year-old Emmanuel Macron in La Providence High School where she was a teacher and he was a student and a classmate of her daughter Laurence. She divorced Auzière in January 2006 and married Macron in October 2007. She has seven grandchildren.

Macron caught COVID-19 over Christmas 2020, her office said on 9 January 2021, confirming press reports. She tested positive on 24 December 2020 but exhibited only light symptoms and tested negative six days later. During that period, she stayed at the official presidential residence, the Élysée Palace, while the president worked at another residence outside Paris. Her office said that her illness was not made public at the time as it had no impact on her public agenda but she had since made a full recovery.

References

External links 

   Charte de transparence relative au statut du conjoint du Chef de l’État, Presidency of the French Republic, 2017

|-

1953 births
Living people
French Roman Catholics
French schoolteachers
Brigitte
People from Amiens
Spouses of French presidents